HD 164595 is a G-type star located in the constellation of Hercules,  from Earth that is notably similar to the Sun. With an apparent magnitude of 7.075, the star can be found with binoculars or a small telescope in the constellation Hercules.

The star has the same stellar classification as the Sun: G2V. It has a lower logarithm of metallicity ratio, at −0.06 compared with 0.00, and a slightly younger age, at 4.5 versus 4.6 billion years.

Planetary system
HD 164595 has one known planet, which orbits HD 164595 every 40 days. It was detected with the radial velocity technique with the SOPHIE echelle spectrograph. The planet has a minimal mass equivalent of 16 Earths.

Signal observation and SETI 
In 2016, HD 164595 briefly attracted media attention after it was reported that a possible SETI signal had been detected from the direction of the star in the previous year. The signal was only heard once and never confirmed by other telescopes, and is thought to have been due to terrestrial interference.

On 15 May 2015, a brief, single radio signal at 11 GHz (2.7 cm wavelength) was observed in the direction of HD 164595 by a team led by N. N. Bursov involving Claudio Maccone at the RATAN-600 radio observatory. The signal may have been caused by terrestrial radio-frequency interference or gravitational lensing from a more distant source. It was observed only once (for two seconds), by a single team, at a single telescope, giving it a Rio Scale score of 1 (insignificant) or 2 (low). Discussions in the media from 29 August 2016 onwards featured speculation that the signal could be caused by an isotropic beacon from a Type II civilization.

The senior astronomer of the SETI Institute, Seth Shostak, stated that confirmation by another telescope is required. Astronomer Nicholas Suntzeff of Texas A&M University stated that the signal is in a military frequency band, and that it could have been a satellite downlink, implying that some such systems may be kept secret and therefore would be unknown to SETI scientists.

SETI and METI studies followed with the Allen Telescope Array and the Boquete Optical SETI Observatory. Also, scientists at Berkeley SETI Research Center at the University of California, Berkeley observed HD 164595 using the Green Bank Telescope as part of the Breakthrough Listen program. No signal was detected at the position and frequency of the transient reported by the RATAN group.

The Special Astrophysical Observatory of the Russian Academy of Sciences has since released an official statement that the signal is of a "most probable terrestrial origin".

See also 
 Arecibo message, a three-minute-long message sent into space
 HD 162826
 Tabby's Star (KIC 8462852)
 Wow! signal, possible alien radio signal

Footnotes

References

Hercules (constellation)
164595
G-type main-sequence stars
088194
BD+29 3165
J18003890+2934188
Search for extraterrestrial intelligence
Planetary systems with one confirmed planet
2016 in science